Saltbush Bill on the Patriarchs is a humorous poem by Australian writer and poet Andrew Barton "Banjo" Paterson. It was first published in The Evening News on 19 December 1903.

Saltbush Bill was one of Paterson's best known characters who appeared in 5 poems: "Saltbush Bill" (1894), "Saltbush Bill's Second Fight" (1897), "Saltbush Bill's Gamecock" (1898), "Saltbush Bill on the Patriarchs" (1903), and "Saltbush Bill, J.P." (1905).

Plot summary

Saltbush Bill tells the story of a successful sheep farmer using the biblical story of Isaac and Jacob as a metaphor.

Further publications

 Saltbush Bill, J.P., and Other Verses by Banjo Paterson (1917)
 The Drovers edited by Keith Willey (1982)
 Song of the Pen, A. B. (Banjo) Paterson : Complete Works 1901-1941 edited by Rosamund Campbell and Philippa Harvie (1983)
 A Vision Splendid : The Complete Poetry of A. B. 'Banjo' Paterson (1990)
 The Collected Verse of Banjo Paterson (1992)

See also
 1903 in poetry
 1903 in literature
 1903 in Australian literature
 Australian literature

References 

1903 poems
Poetry by Banjo Paterson